Cornelius Van Vorst (March 7, 1822 – November 19, 1906) was the twelfth Mayor of Jersey City, serving from 1860 to 1862.

Biography
The kitchen step of his mansion was known to be the slab of marble that was originally the base of the statue of King George III at the Bowling Green in New York. After the statue had been torn down, the slab had been reused as the gravestone of a Major John Smith of the Royal Highlands Regiment. In 1874, Van Vorst donated the stone to the New York Historical Society.

References

External links
 Political Graveyard

Mayors of Jersey City, New Jersey
1822 births
1906 deaths